Going Home is part of the Private Snafu series of animated shorts produced by Warner Bros. during World War II. Made in 1944, the cartoon features the vocal talents of Mel Blanc and was directed by Chuck Jones. The script writers for the Snafu cartoons were typically uncredited, though animation historians consider that the scriptwriter of this short was Dr. Seuss.

Plot

Private Snafu returns from the "global grind" of World War II to the United States home front, on leave from the military. His ship passes the Statue of Liberty to enter the New York Harbor, then he makes his way to his hometown of Podunk. The narrator explains that Snafu, the town's "returning hero", feels "safe at home, away from battle". He also feels safe in discussing military matters with civilians, including restricted information.

He starts by talking to his family and girlfriend (a blonde) over dinner. Describing the recent activities of his unit, the 999th division, and their co-operation with the British Army. He keeps offering information to others while wandering around town. He describes to a police officer the construction details of a secret base and its runway. A crowd gathers round to listen to him. While at a filling station, Snafu tries to impress the female attendant by sharing information on the new Japanese tanks.

At a movie theater, a newsreel reports that one of the Japanese islands was obliterated, that the event is attributed to an American secret weapon, and that Hideki Tojo doesn't know what hit him. Among the audience of the movie theater is Snafu, seated next to an attractive brunette. Trying to impress the lady, he shares information on said secret weapon: a flying bazooka. His detailed information is featured as a schematic diagram.

While drinking at a bar, Snafu reveals information concerning the next planned move against the enemy forces. A mimeograph is depicted printing said information. In a park, Snafu is making out with a young woman behind a bush. He takes the time to describe operations of the Pacific War. The "confidential" information makes it to an electric billboard. At a barber shop, Snafu receives a haircut and a manicure. He can not resist sharing military information with the barber and the manicurist. The narrator makes the point that skywriting the information would be no more effective in making it public.

The final scene starts at Snafu's home, where he and his girlfriend dance the jitterbug. A radio announcement informs them of the latest news from the War Department. The entire 999th division has been annihilated by enemy forces, and the military disaster is blamed on "recent leaks in restricted military information". Snafu is enraged that some jerk "shot his mouth off" and now his division is gone. He wishes for the unknown jerk to be run over by a tram. In response, a tram passes through the living room and runs over Snafu, ending the short.

Release
Completed by May or June 1944, Going Home was never released. The rationale behind the decision is unknown, though there are several theories on the subject:

The scene depicting Snafu and the girl laying (and presumably making out) in the bushes was deemed too sexually suggestive by the standards of the time; a later scene shows the pair dancing, and a flash of the girl's panties can be seen.
The Snafu series was in a transition phase and that the short was too reminiscent of earlier entries. Originally the intended audience of the series consisted of raw recruits which required training in the basics of military life. By the summer of 1944, the target audience had changed, as the military personnel of the United States included millions of combat veterans. To better reflect this audience, the characterization of Snafu changed from an incompetent soldier to one more experienced and efficient.
The portrayal of the United States home front was too negative. In other entries of the series, leaked information reaches the enemy through the services of spies; here, this information somehow reaches the enemy when released to American civilians. In other words, the civilians are the conduit which transmits the information and undermines the military effort.
The finale featured a joke about the annihilation of a military unit, which was hardly likely to entertain a military audience.
The secret weapon, able to obliterate entire islands, was deemed a bit too close in nature to an actual military secret: the atomic bomb.

Sources
 Friedwald, Will and Jerry Beck. "The Warner Brothers Cartoons." Scarecrow Press Inc., Metuchen, N.J., 1981. .

References

External links
 

1944 films
1944 animated films
Short films directed by Chuck Jones
Films set in a movie theatre
Films set in the United States
Articles containing video clips
Private Snafu
Cultural depictions of Hideki Tojo
Films scored by Carl Stalling
Films produced by Leon Schlesinger
American black-and-white films
1944 comedy films
1940s Warner Bros. animated short films
1940s American films